The European Menopause and Andropause Society is an institution that promotes the study, and encourages research, of midlife health.

Mission

EMAS "strives to encourage the study of Menopause and Andropause as well as promote the exchange of research and professional experience between members through its journal, congresses, schools, Junior Mentorship Programme [JuMP] and website."

Activities

The official journal of the European Menopause and Andropause Society, Maturitas, is published on a monthly basis by  Elsevier Science It covers a variety of disciplines, including management of chronic diseases, epidemiology, therapeutic techniques, and alternative medicine. The journal impact factor is 5.110. Irene Lambrinoudaki and Leon Flicker are the Editors-in-Chief.

EMAS participates in a variety of medical congresses related to menopause, gynecology, and obstetrics each year. The society hosts its own European Congress every two years. EMAS also organises educational schools on menopausal health. The last one in June 2022 was held virtually.  

EMAS provides online education on its web site with the text book EMAS Care Online 2020 accompanied by power point presentations. It also has monthly webinars in both English and Spanish.  EMAS  publishes position statements and clinical guides in Maturitas and these are also available on the web site. Position statements and clinical guides relate to menopausal health and ageing. The aim of the mentorship programme JuMP is to encourage career development of junior clinicians and researchers in the field of post-reproductive health by pairing one expert mentor will be paired with a mentee, based on mutual research interests. The current round, 2021 – 2023, is underway.
The 12th European Congress on Menopause and Andropause  was held in Berlin, in May 2019.

The 13th European Congress on Menopause and Andropause took place virtually  8-10 September 2021 starting with an Open Door Day on 7 September with the launch of the first-ever World Menopause & Work Day. This was accompanied by a new Menopause and Work Charter to promote the recognition and consideration of menopausal health in the workplace as part of broader policies on wellness and equality across gender and age. The 14th European Congress on Menopause and Andropause “sharing expertise for changing times” will take place in Florence, Italy, from 3 – 5 May 2023.

See also
North American Menopause Society
International Menopause Society

References

External links 
 EMAS Website
 Maturitas Journal Website

International medical associations of Europe
Menopause
Research institutes in Switzerland